Warren Petersen is an American politician and a Republican member of the Arizona Senate representing District 14 from January 9, 2023. He currently serves as President of the Arizona Senate. He formerly was a State Representative, also representing District 12. He was elected by his peers to serve as Majority Leader from 2018–2019.

Elections 
In 2012, Arizona redistricted and Legislative District 12 was drawn to cover Gilbert and Queen Creek.  Steve Urie decided to leave the legislature, leaving an open seat in the House. Petersen ran in the three-way August 28, 2012, Republican primary. Incumbent Representative Eddie Farnsworth placed first, Petersen placed second with 12,500 votes, and former state Senator Larry Chesley placed third with 8,688 votes. Farnsworth and Petersen were unopposed in the November 6, 2012, general election, with Farnsworth placing first and Petersen taking second with 52,590 votes.

In 2014, Petersen and Farnsworth were unopposed in the primary, with Petersen placing first with 16,442 votes and Farnsworth placing second with 15,351 votes. In November, there was a three-way general election with Petersen taking first with 34,784 votes, Farnsworth taking second with 32,843 and Rothans receiving 18,446 votes for third place.

In 2016, Andy Biggs left the Arizona Senate to run for Congress in CD5. Petersen ran to replace Biggs in the State Senate.  Petersen won the General Election 69,356 votes to Elizabeth Brown's 37,178 votes.

Legislation
In 2015 Petersen sponsored SB 1241 which banned municipalities within Arizona to require businesses to report energy usage or regulate auxiliary containers, known as the plastic bag ban preemption which ensures businesses do not have to deal with inconsistent regulations across the state. This is one of many preemptive laws enacted to prevent local governments from enacting laws to address local issues  such as plastic pollution. The law helps prevent confusing patchwork laws that vary from place to place and instead establishes the uniform practices of plastic bag recycling which every consumer can easily find out about by searching their local zip code for plastic bag recycling centers that may or may not be in operation due to ever changing conditions.

References

External links 
 Official page at the Arizona State Legislature
 Campaign site
 

21st-century American politicians
Living people
Place of birth missing (living people)
Republican Party Arizona state senators
Republican Party members of the Arizona House of Representatives
Year of birth missing (living people)